Edison John Clayton Loney (23 February 1929 – 22 January 2017) was a member of the House of Commons of Canada in the 1960s and again in the 1990s. His career has been in agriculture and business.

Loney, a Progressive Conservative for most of his political career, first won a seat in Canadian Parliament during the 1963 federal election for the Bruce electoral district in Ontario. He was re-elected there in the 1965 federal election, but defeated in 1968. During this time, Loney served in the 26th and 27th Canadian Parliaments.

Loney made further unsuccessful attempts to regain the Bruce riding in 1972 and 1974. He moved to Alberta and made another failed attempt to return to Parliament in the Edmonton North riding in the 1988 federal election.

After switching to the Liberal party, Loney won Edmonton North in the 1993 federal election. After serving in the 35th Canadian Parliament, he did not seek another term in Parliament and left Canadian politics in 1997.

External links
 

1929 births
2017 deaths
Liberal Party of Canada MPs
Members of the House of Commons of Canada from Alberta
Members of the House of Commons of Canada from Ontario
People from Bruce County
Progressive Conservative Party of Canada MPs